Gaskom is a village in the Tenkodogo Department of Boulgou Province in south-eastern Burkina Faso. In 2005, the village has a population of 472.

Notes

Populated places in the Centre-Est Region
Boulgou Province